76th meridian may refer to:

76th meridian east, a line of longitude east of the Greenwich Meridian
76th meridian west, a line of longitude west of the Greenwich Meridian